Denise Pumain (born 1946) is a French geographer. Pumain specialises in urban and theoretical geography. She is a member of the Austrian Academy of Sciences and of the British Academy.

Early life and education
Pumain was born in 1946. She studied geography at the École Normale Supérieure between 1965 and 1969 and received her doctorate in human sciences and literature in 1980.

Career

She began teaching at the Paris 1 Panthéon-Sorbonne University in 1970. She became a researcher for the Institut national d'études démographiques in 1981 until 1986. In 1986, she became a Professor at the Paris 13 University before returning to the Paris 1 Pantheon-Sorbonne University to teach in 1989. She also held the post of rector at the Académie de Grenoble between 2000 and 2001. In 1996, she founded the geography journal Cybergeo.

She was awarded with a CNRS Bronze medal in 1984, decorated as a Chevalier of the Order of the Légion d'honneur in 1999 and decorated as an officer of the National Order of Merit in 2009. Pumain also became a member of the Academia Europaea in 1995, became a Corresponding Member of the Austrian Academy of Sciences in 2009 and became a Corresponding Fellow of the British Academy in 2012. In 2010, she won the Vautrin Lud Prize and also received an Advanced Grant from the European Research Council to research different urban dynamics in cities across the world.

References

1946 births
Living people
Officers of the Ordre national du Mérite
Chevaliers of the Légion d'honneur
Members of the Austrian Academy of Sciences
Corresponding Fellows of the British Academy
École Normale Supérieure alumni
Academic staff of the University of Paris
Members of Academia Europaea
Recipients of the Vautrin Lud International Geography Prize
French geographers
Women geographers